Disney's Coronado Springs Resort is a resort hotel at the Walt Disney World Resort that opened on August 1, 1997. The resort is located in the Animal Kingdom Resort Area. Its theme is American colonial Spanish and southwestern American. This hotel is categorized as a 'moderate' resort. This was Walt Disney World's first attempt at a 'moderate' resort with a convention center. It is the only moderate level Disney resort with suites, a cafeteria-style restaurant, a formal dinner restaurant (Maya Grill), a gift shop, an arcade, one large pool, three quiet pools, a salon, fitness center, and a dance club. The resort is owned and operated by Disney Parks, Experiences and Products.

In February 2017, a large expansion was announced, with the centerpiece being a 15-story tower located near the entrance and convention center. Other things added are "floating gardens and a oasis which connects to the rest of the resort via a series of bridges".

Accommodation descriptions

There are 1,951 rooms at Disney's Coronado Springs Resort located in four sections across the property.  Gran Destino Tower is the main building with rooms on the 3rd through 15th floors. The Casitas are made up of 5 buildings that have 4 floors and are close to the Convention Center.  The Ranchos are made of up 4 pueblo-style buildings that have 3 floors.  The Cabanas are made up of 3 buildings that have 2 floors. All rooms were renovated in 2018 with new beds, a new flat screen TV, and other new furnishings.

Pools and recreation
The Lost City of Cibola Feature Pool (The Dig Site) – This themed area includes a huge pool (120-by-90), a sand volleyball court, the largest outdoor hot tub on Walt Disney World property, the  Explorer's Playground, and the Iguana Arcade. The focal point of the resort, the Dig Site's , 5 story tall Mayan pyramid themed, with water slide, as a modern archaeological dig of an ancient lost kingdom. At the beginning of the day the Mayan pyramid is turned on and a huge stream of water flows down the giant steps. (Kids are allowed to participate in the opening.) The Dig Site underwent a massive renovation ending in December 2018.
Poolside Activities – Family-friendly activities each day at the Lost City of Cibola Feature Pool include Disney trivia, an afternoon pool party and an evening campfire.
Explorer's Playground – A themed, outdoor playground located at The Dig Site main pool complex includes swings, a water-slide, slides, and an "archeological dig sand box".
Iguana Arcade – Adjacent to The Dig Site, an indoor arcade which offers a variety of electronic games.
Movies Under the Stars – Adjacent to the main pool, nightly offering of a Disney movie, weather permitting.
Pools – Three additional courtyard quiet pools are located throughout the resort.
La Vida Health Club – A  health club and the first fitness center to be located at a Disney moderate resort.
Casa de Belleza Beauty Salon – The salon at Coronado Springs Resort, as well as at all Disney properties, is run by Niki Bryan Salon's. It is adjacent to the La Vida Health Club.
La Marina – Open seasonally, the marina offers watercraft rentals to guests including boats, water-cycles, kayaks, paddle-boats, and fishing excursions in addition to bike rentals. However, "La Marina" appears to be predominantly disused, and is rarely in operation.

Expansion 

 Gran Destino Hotel Tower -  A 15-story tower, taking its name and thematic cues from the Salvador Dalí collaboration short film "Destino", added 545 guest rooms including 50 suites, and features a Spanish rooftop restaurant named "Toledo" and the "Dahlia Lounge". The tower opened in July 2019. The resort's lobby and bus stop moved to the tower when completed. It is also the only Disney-owned building in Walt Disney World to use a destination dispatch elevator control system (specifically Otis CompassPlus).
 Restaurant - In addition to the restaurant at the top of the tower, Disney also added a restaurant in the middle of Lago Dorado called "Three Bridges Bar and Grill".
 Updated and Modernized Guest Rooms - All guest rooms have been updated with wood floors, new beds, USB ports, flat screen TVs, Keurig coffee machines, new art, new color scheme and the renovation of the bathrooms.

Convention Center
The Coronado Springs Resort Convention Center is the largest convention center on Walt Disney World property featuring  of meeting space. It has been designated as being the premier single-level hotel convention facility on the east-coast and is one of the largest single-level hotel convention centers in the Southeast. There is a business center located on site.

References 

 Room Stays website, at http://www.roomstays.com/hotel/1000305 
 Hotels.com website, at http://www.hotels.com/ho128892/disney-s-coronado-springs-resort-lake-buena-vista-united-states/ 
 Expedia website, at http://www.expedia.com/Orlando-Hotels-Disneys-Coronado-Springs-Resort.h41508.Hotel-Reviews 
 Doug Ingersoll, The Complete Idiot's Guide to Walt Disney World, 2012 Edition (N.p.: Penguin, 2011), pp. 85–7.
 Bob Sehlinger and Len Testa, The Unofficial Guide to Walt Disney World 2014 (N.p.: Unofficial Guides, 2013), pp. 186–8.
 Fodor's 2013 Walt Disney World: With Universal, Seaworld, and the Best of Central Florida (New York: Fodor's Travel, 2012), p. 100.

External links 
 

Coronado Springs Resort
Convention centers in Florida
Hotel buildings completed in 1997
Hotels established in 1997
1997 establishments in Florida